SWEEPS J175853.92-291120.6 is a star located in the constellation Sagittarius at a distance of 27,700 light-years from Earth. At least one planet, SWEEPS-04, is known to orbit the star.

Characteristics
The star has a magnitude of 18 with a mass of 1.24 solar masses and radius of 1.18 solar radii.  The designation "SWEEPS J175853.92−291120.6" is named after the project SWEEPS, formally called the Sagittarius Window Eclipsing Extrasolar Planet Search. The project also found its planetary companion.

Planetary system
In 2006, a group of astronomers working on the SWEEPS program announced the discovery of the planet SWEEPS-04 in the system. The planet is a gas giant that is close to the parent star at 0.05 AU. The planet is classified as a hot Jupiter due to its proximity to the parent star. The planet was discovered through the transit method.

See also
List of stars in Sagittarius

References

External links

 
 
 This article is based on the Russian Wikipedia article, SWEEPS J175853.92-291120.6

Sagittarius (constellation)
Planetary systems with one confirmed planet
F-type main-sequence stars
Planetary transit variables
Sagittarius Window Eclipsing Extrasolar Planet Search